The 1959–60 NBA season was the 14th season of the National Basketball Association.  The season ended with the Boston Celtics winning their 2nd straight NBA title, beating the St. Louis Hawks 4 games to 3 in the NBA Finals.

Notable occurrences 
 On November 7, 1959 in a game between the Boston Celtics and the Philadelphia Warriors, Bill Russell and Wilt Chamberlain played the first game of their 10-year professional rivalry.
 The 1960 NBA All-Star Game was played in Philadelphia, with the East beating the West 125–115. Rookie Wilt Chamberlain of the local Philadelphia Warriors won the game's MVP award.
 The Minneapolis Lakers played their final season in the Twin Cities. There would not be another NBA team in Minnesota until the Minnesota Timberwolves in 1989–90.
 In an interesting quirk in the schedule, the Philadelphia Warriors and Minneapolis Lakers play a two-game series in California on January 31 – February 1, 1960, with the first game being played in San Francisco (the Warriors' future home) and the second in Los Angeles (the Lakers' future home).
 The NBA schedule was expanded from 72 games per team to 75.

Final standings

Eastern Division

Western Division

x – clinched playoff spot

Playoffs

Statistics leaders

Note: Prior to the 1969–70 season, league leaders in points, rebounds, and assists were determined by totals rather than averages.

NBA awards
Most Valuable Player: Wilt Chamberlain, Philadelphia Warriors
Rookie of the Year: Wilt Chamberlain, Philadelphia Warriors

All-NBA First Team:
F – Elgin Baylor, Minneapolis Lakers
F – Bob Pettit, St. Louis Hawks
C – Wilt Chamberlain, Philadelphia Warriors
G – Bob Cousy, Boston Celtics
G – Gene Shue, Detroit Pistons

All-NBA Second Team:
F – Dolph Schayes, Syracuse Nationals
F – Jack Twyman, Cincinnati Royals
C – Bill Russell, Boston Celtics
G – Richie Guerin, New York Knicks
G – Bill Sharman, Boston Celtics

References
1959–60 NBA Season Summary basketball-reference.com. Retrieved March 30, 2010.